The New World is a sculpture by Tom Otterness, installed outside Los Angeles' Edward R. Roybal Federal Building, in the U.S. state of California.

Description 
The work is installed in a central plaza in three parts. One fountain has a reclining bronze child and a bronze globe. A niche in a pillar has an abstract metal female figure on a chair. Her ankle is chained to the wall. An overhead cast concrete frieze runs along a pergola and down its columns. The frieze has abstract human figures carrying balls, boxes, and pillars. A human figure in the center of the frieze has multiple arms and holds a knife in one hand and a decapitated human head in another. A nearby human figure clings to the underside of a rhinoceros, and another depicts a human figure with an elephant.

History 
The abstract work was completed during 1982–1991 and installed in 1992. It cost $266,000. The artwork was surveyed as part of the Smithsonian Institution's "Save Outdoor Sculpture!" program in 1995.

References 

1992 establishments in California
Abstract sculptures in California
Animal sculptures in California
Bronze sculptures in California
Civic Center, Los Angeles
Concrete sculptures in California
Downtown Los Angeles
Elephants in art
Mammals in art
Outdoor sculptures in Greater Los Angeles
Rhinoceroses in popular culture
Sculptures of children in the United States
Sculptures of women in California